Moonlight (French: Clair de lune) is a 1932 French comedy film directed by Henri Diamant-Berger and starring Blanche Montel, Claude Dauphin and Henri Rollan. The film was shot on location around Cannes.

Synopsis
While sailing on a yacht off the French Riviera a shy young man and the owner's daughter are shipwrecked on an island.

Cast
 Blanche Montel as Lucie
 Claude Dauphin as Jacques
 Henri Rollan as Le philosophe
 Jean Joffre as Ernest
 Yvonne Rozille as Berthe Lydiane 
 Jeanne Cheirel as La baronne Jeanne de Bonasette
 Lulu Vattier as Noémie 
 Andrée Lorraine as Andrée	
 Georges Térof as Un marin

References

Bibliography 
 Oscherwitz, Dayna & Higgins, MaryEllen. The A to Z of French Cinema. Scarecrow Press, 2009.

External links 
 

1932 films
French comedy films
French black-and-white films
1932 comedy films
1930s French-language films
Films directed by Henri Diamant-Berger
1930s French films